Carlos Alberto Uribe (born 26 September 1969) is a Colombian former footballer who played as a forward. He competed in the men's tournament at the 1992 Summer Olympics.

References

External links
 
 

1969 births
Living people
Sportspeople from Medellín
Association football forwards
Colombian footballers
Colombia international footballers
Olympic footballers of Colombia
Footballers at the 1992 Summer Olympics
Categoría Primera A players
Independiente Medellín footballers
20th-century Colombian people